Theta Piscis Austrini, Latinized as θ Piscis Austrini, is a binary star system in the southern constellation of Piscis Austrinus. It is faintly visible to the naked eye with a combined apparent visual magnitude of +5.01. Based upon an annual parallax shift of 10.16 mas as seen from the Earth, the system is located around 320 light years from the Sun. The system is drifting further away with a radial velocity of +13 km/s.

The binary nature of this system was discovered in 1951 by South African astronomer W. S. Finsen. Both components A and B have the same apparent magnitude. They orbit each other with a period of 20 years and an eccentricity of 0.256. The pair are A-type main sequence stars with stellar classifications of A1 V. A magnitude 11.3 visual companion star, labelled component C, is located at an angular separation of 33.2 arc seconds along a position angle of 342°, as of 1999.

Theta Piscis Austrini is moving through the Galaxy at a speed of 21.3 km/s relative to the Sun.

Naming

References

A-type main-sequence stars
Double stars
Piscis Austrinus
Piscis Austrini, Theta
Durchmusterung objects
Piscis Austrini, 10
207155
107608
8326
Binary stars